Mr. Natural is the Bee Gees' twelfth album (tenth worldwide), released in May 1974. It was the first Bee Gees release produced by Arif Mardin, who was partially responsible for launching the group's later major success with the follow-up album Main Course. The album's rhythm and blues, soul, funk and hard rock sounds initiated the group's reinvention as a disco and blue-eyed soul act, which would solidify on subsequent albums. However, Barry Gibb has said that the album was "whiter" than Main Course. The cover photograph was taken at 334 West 4th Street, Greenwich Village, New York City by Frank Moscati, which is today known as The Corner Bistro tavern. 

The LP was the Bee Gees' worst-performing international release at the time, reaching No. 178 on the Billboard 200 but failing to chart elsewhere, including in Europe where the group had previously enjoyed their most consistent popularity. However, it was a moderate success in the group's adopted home of Australia, where it reached No. 20.

Background
The decision to work with Mardin came after the RSO label rejected the brothers' post-Life in a Tin Can album, which had been provisionally entitled A Kick in the Head Is Worth Eight in the Pants. Robert Stigwood was not ready to give up on the Bee Gees, but he did not believe in the musical direction they were taking. At the suggestion of Jerry Wexler and Ahmet Ertegun of Atlantic, Stigwood sent them to work with Atlantic producer and arranger Arif Mardin, who began to draw out their love of rhythm and blues music. Mardin brought the band's attention to the dance scene unfolding at the time, and the brothers Gibb in turn adapted their songwriting and arrangements to a more upbeat style.

Recording
Recording began in November 1973, and although they were self-conscious about doing a really black sound, their first goal was to record songs in a way that they could reproduce on stage. They made more use of Alan Kendall's lead guitar and added a keyboardist, which resulted in less recording for Maurice, who had long overdubbed many instrumental and backing vocal parts; he would now focus almost exclusively on playing bass and singing backing vocals during the trio's R&B/disco era. The new sound was more electric than much of what they had done since regrouping in 1970. With Mardin at the helm, the Bee Gees returned to the IBC Studios, London where they had recorded much of their pre-Life in a Tin Can output. The first two songs recorded were harder rock ("Heavy Breathing" and "I Can't Let You Go"), both written in Los Angeles. This was a deliberate attempt to record a new sound, compared to the acoustic sounds found on Life in a Tin Can. There were also two new backing musicians: Dennis Bryon on drums and Geoff Westley on keyboards, who were in the tour band, now made their debut with the Bee Gees on disc. Bryon was a friend of Kendall, and would be the Bee Gees' drummer until 1980. The big change here was having Westley, or in fact anyone, play most of the piano and keyboard parts that had been Maurice's domain for years. Westley would soon be replaced as keyboardist by ex-Strawbs keyboardist Derek "Blue" Weaver, whom Bryon had played with in Amen Corner. Around this time, Maurice's problems with alcohol began to surface; although he wrote few songs in 1974, he never missed a show or a recording session, but on this album, most of the new songs were written by Barry and Robin only. Three songs were written by all three brothers; one,  Lost in Your Love was a solo Barry composition while Give A Hand, Take A Hand was a Barry/Maurice composition (see Notes). The songs "Mr. Natural" and "Had a Lot of Love Last Night" were recorded and completed at the Command Studios in London. The songs "Give a Hand, Take a Hand" and "Lost in Your Love" were recorded at Atlantic Studios in 1974. Maurice said in an interview with Lynn Redgrave that his alcoholism didn't affect his recording sessions and concerts until around the time of Spirits Having Flown.

"When we did Mr. Natural we didn't have a positive direction", Maurice said, "We were thrashing about". In an interview with the Bee Gees for Billboard on 24 March 2001, Maurice recalls about producer Arif Mardin, "Arif was brilliant, full of ideas. That's why we did the Mr. Natural album with him, which was like a rehearsal".

Reception

Mr. Natural generated no global hits, but represented an important step in The Bee Gees' evolution. The album shows a strong Philadelphia soul influence in tracks like "Throw a Penny". Other highlights include "Mr. Natural", the infectious rock tunes "Down the Road" (the beginning of which starts during the long fade of "Throw a Penny," about 20 seconds before "Throw a Penny" segues into "Down the Road") and "Heavy Breathing", and the power ballad "Charade". Despite the fact that the Bee Gees and Mardin point to the background vocal session for "Nights on Broadway" as the genesis of the trademark Bee Gee falsetto, those with keen ears can hear a distinctive (albeit subtle in comparison to later recordings) Barry Gibb falsetto in the backing vocals of "Dogs". Despite sincere attempts to create a new sound, Mr. Natural was not commercially successful".

The gospel-tinged song "Give a Hand, Take a Hand" was written in 1969 (hence Robin's lack of writing credit, since he wasn't working with his brothers at the time) and originally recorded for their 1970 album Cucumber Castle but was not released and was used by P.P. Arnold; her version was released in September 1969 as a single, which was produced by Barry Gibb. The Staple Singers also covered "Give a Hand, Take a Hand"; their version was released on their 1971 album The Staple Swingers.

On the album cover, the Bee Gees are not pictured anywhere in the exterior album package. The front and back are an art concept of a man in a bar, looking blissfully out the window on the front and being ejected smiling on the back, and on the paper, it says "Every SUNDAY brunch". The Corner Bistro bar is located at 334 West 4th Street, Greenwich Village, New York City.

Track listing
All tracks written by Barry and Robin Gibb, except where noted.

Personnel
Bee Gees
Barry Gibb – lead, harmony and backing vocals, rhythm guitar
Robin Gibb – lead, harmony and backing vocals
Maurice Gibb – harmony and backing vocals, bass guitar, Mellotron, Hammond organ

Guest musicians
Alan Kendall – lead guitar
Dennis Bryon – drums, percussion
 Geoff Westley – piano, keyboards
 Ben Law – fretless bass on #6 (side 2)
 Phil Bodner – clarinet on "Charade"
Arif Mardin – orchestral arrangement

Production
Damon Lyon-Shaw – engineer
 Andy Knight, Alan Lucas, Gene Paul – engineer
 Arif Mardin – producer

Chart positions

References

Bee Gees albums
1974 albums
Albums arranged by Arif Mardin
Albums produced by Arif Mardin
Albums recorded at IBC Studios
RSO Records albums